Cheatahs is the debut studio album by London-based band Cheatahs. It was released in February 2014 by Wichita Recordings.

Track list

References

2014 albums
Wichita Recordings albums